The Museum of Vojvodina is an art and natural history museum in Novi Sad, Serbia. The museum houses a collection of over 400,000 specimens and a library of over 50,000 volumes.

Notable paintings
Among others, the following paintings are located in the museum:
'Madonna with Child', by Paris Bordone
'Christ and Centurion', by Carlo Caliari
'Holy Mother with Christ', by Giulio Licinio
'Seneca', by Peter Paul Rubens (stolen)
'Vulcan's Mint', by Peter Paul Rubens
'Tentida gets weapons', by Peter Paul Rubens
'Self Portrait', by Rembrandt (stolen)
'Portrait of Man with Sword', by Palma Giovane
'Katon's Death', by Giovan Battista Langetti
'Resting Soldiers', by Alessandro Magnasco
'Holy Family with St. Ivan', by Cesare Gennari
'Queen Saba's Visiting', by Frans Francken the Younger
'Magdalena with Dead Christ', by Marco Antonio Bassetti
'Flowers', by Jan van Huysum
'Portrait of Vitoria della Rovera', by Justus Sustermans

Gallery

References

External links
 

Culture in Novi Sad
Museums in Serbia
Museums established in 1847
1847 establishments in the Austrian Empire